Adam Charles Roberts  (born 30 June 1965) is a British science fiction and fantasy novelist. In 2018 he was elected vice-president of the H.G. Wells Society.

Career
He has a degree in English from the University of Aberdeen and a PhD from Cambridge University on Robert Browning and the Classics. He teaches English literature and creative writing at Royal Holloway, University of London.

Adam Roberts has been nominated three times for the Arthur C. Clarke Award: in 2001 for his debut novel, Salt, in 2007 for Gradisil and in 2010 for Yellow Blue Tibia. He won both the 2012 BSFA Award for Best Novel, and the John W. Campbell Memorial Award, for Jack Glass. It was further shortlisted for The Kitschies Red Tentacle award. His short story "Tollund" was nominated for the 2014 Sidewise Award. On his website, Roberts states that an ongoing project of his is to write a short story in every science fiction sub-genre.

In May 2014, Roberts gave the second annual Tolkien Lecture at Pembroke College, Oxford, speaking on the topic of Tolkien and Women.

Published works

Novels 
 Salt (2000)
 On (2001)
 Stone (2002)
 Polystom (2003)
 The Snow (2004)
 Gradisil (2006)
 Land of the Headless (2007)
 Splinter (2007)
 Swiftly: A Novel (2008)
 Yellow Blue Tibia: A Novel (2009)
 New Model Army (2010)
 By Light Alone (2011)
 Jack Glass (2012)
 Twenty Trillion Leagues Under the Sea (2014)
 Bête (2014)
 The Thing Itself (2015)
 The Real-Town Murders (2017)
 By the Pricking of Her Thumb (2018)
 Haven (2018)
 The Black Prince (2018)
 Purgatory Mount (2021)
 The This (2022)

Novellas and short story collections
 Park Polar (2002)
 Jupiter Magnified (2003)
 Swiftly: Stories (2004)
 "S-Bomb" in Riffing on Strings: Creative Writing Inspired by String Theory (2008)
 Anticopernicus (2011)
 Adam Robots (2013)
 "Trademark Bugs: A Legal History", Reach for Infinity (2014)
 Saint Rebor (2015)
 Bethany (2016)
 The Lake Boy (2018)
 The Man Who Would Be Kling (2019)
 The Compelled (2020)
 Stealing for the Sky (2022)

Parodies 
 The Soddit (2003, The Hobbit)
 The McAtrix Derided (2004, The Matrix)
 The Sellamillion (2004, The Silmarillion)
 Star Warped (2005, Star Wars)
 The Va Dinci Cod (2005, The Da Vinci Code)
 Doctor Whom: E.T. Shoots and Leaves (2006, Doctor Who)
 I am Scrooge: A Zombie Story for Christmas  (2009, Charles Dickens, A Christmas Carol).
 The Dragon with the Girl Tattoo (2010, The Girl with the Dragon Tattoo)
 I, Soddit: The Autobiography (2013, The Hobbit)

Criticism 
 Silk and Potatoes: Contemporary Arthurian Fantasy (1998)
 Science Fiction: the New Critical Idiom (2000, second edition 2005)
 Tolkien: A Look Behind "The Lord of the Rings" (with Lin Carter) (updated edition 2003)
 The History of Science Fiction (Palgrave Histories of Literature) (2006, second edition 2016)
 The Riddles of The Hobbit (Palgrave Macmillan) (2013)
 Sibilant Fricative: Essays and Reviews (2014)
 Rave and Let Die: The SF and Fantasy of 2014 (2015) (Won the BSFA Award for Best Non-Fiction.)
 It's the End of the World: But What Are We Really Afraid Of (2020) (Won the BSFA Award for Best Non-Fiction.)

Poetry
 Wodwo Vergil (2018)

Other non-fiction
 Get Started in: Writing Science Fiction and Fantasy (2014)

References

External links 

Academic Biography at RoyalHolloway.ac.uk 

 
 Don Brine at LC Authorities, with 1 record
The Valve: A Literary Organ (blog, archived December 2013)
Bibliography at SciFan (archived December 2014)
 Review of Twenty Trillion Leagues Under the Sea at Upcoming4.me (archived February 2014)

1965 births
Living people
Academics of Royal Holloway, University of London
Alumni of the University of Aberdeen
English male novelists
English male short story writers
English short story writers
English fantasy writers
English science fiction writers
British parodists
Parody novelists
English literary critics
Science fiction academics
Alumni of the University of Cambridge
Writers from London